Rahim Rızvanoğlu (born April 1, 1986) is a Turkish professional basketball player who plays as a point guard for Uşak Sportif of the Turkish Basketball League.

External links
Rahim Rızvanoğlu FIBA Profile
Rahim Rızvanoğlu TBLStat.net Profile
Rahim Rızvanoğlu Eurobasket Profile
Rahim Rızvanoğlu TBL Profile

1986 births
Living people
Türk Telekom B.K. players
Basketball players from Istanbul
Turkish men's basketball players
Uşak Sportif players
İstanbul Teknik Üniversitesi B.K. players
Antalya Büyükşehir Belediyesi players
Tofaş S.K. players
Point guards